John Stratford Dugdale KC (30 July 1835 – 27 October 1920) was a lawyer and Conservative Party politician in the United Kingdom.

He was elected at the 1886 general election as Member of Parliament (MP) for Nuneaton, having stood unsuccessfully in 1885. He stood down at the 1892 general election, and did not stand again.

Shortly before his election, Dugdale was resident at Blythe Hall, Coleshill, and was Recorder for Birmingham. He was a King's Counsel.

An oil portrait of Dugdale, by William Carter, is in Warwick Shire Hall.

References

External links 

1835 births
1920 deaths
Conservative Party (UK) MPs for English constituencies
UK MPs 1886–1892
19th-century King's Counsel
People from Coleshill, Warwickshire